Zagoričani is a village in the city of Livno in Canton 10, the Federation of Bosnia and Herzegovina, Bosnia and Herzegovina.

History 

Village of Zagoričani was mentioned for the first time in 1400 in grant of Stjepan Ostoja to Hrvoje Vukčić Hrvatinić. In the list of neighbouring places of Livno from 1711, there were 15 villages mentioned, including Zagoričani. Bishop Pavao Dragičević mentioned Zagoričani along with Potočani as one of the Croat-populated villages of Livno with other 35 villages.

Zagoričani and Potočani were one village at first, known as Podgreda. This village was scattered and had many hamlets. People who came to town Livno were serfs at the time. As the population from Zagoričani came from the hill, the townsfolk named them "Zagoričani" (people from the hill), this the village was named by its residents Zagoričani.

Demographics 

According to the 2013 census, its population was 761.

Footnotes

Bibliography 

 

Populated places in Livno